Christopher Marshall Trotter (born 1956) is a political commentator in New Zealand. He is the editor of the occasional Political Review magazine.

Biography
Chris Trotter has worked for unions and was on the New Zealand Council (the national council) of the Labour Party. He has contributed to the Independent Financial Review. He makes semi-frequent television appearances as a political commentator.

Trotter was a member of the Labour Party, but when Labour MP Jim Anderton quit the party, Trotter followed him into the  NewLabour Party (NLP). He stood for the party in the  electorate and was NLP spokesperson for electoral reform and state services.

Trotter is the author of No Left Turn, a political history of New Zealand. Novelist, poet and critic C K Stead described the book as "a dashingly written and persuasive elegy for the Scandinavian-style socialist democracy New Zealand might have been, and at the same time a realistic (though at times appropriately angry) acknowledgement that, given the forces, internal and external, ranged against it, the chances of it happening, and lasting, were never very good."

In February 2008, he said that Labour leader and prime minister Helen Clark should stand down before that year's general election and be replaced by Phil Goff, who he thought may have been Labour's only hope of regaining ground with struggling families. He later recanted, arguing that Goff, who became leader after the 2008 election, should have stood down in his turn before the 2011 New Zealand general election, arguing that David Cunliffe should replace him.

In July 2018, Trotter joined the Free Speech Coalition, a group of former politicians, lawyers, journalists, and academics that pursued legal action against the Mayor of Auckland and former Labour leader Phil Goff for denying Auckland Council facilities to two Canadian alt-right activists Lauren Southern and Stefan Molyneux. Trotter justified his defense of the two alt-right activists' free speech by arguing that left-wing opponents of the tour lacked the courage to debate the alt-right. By 2021, Trotter was involved with the Coalition, which had relaunched itself as the New Zealand Free Speech Union. The organisation is led by former National Party adviser Jonathan Ayling and claims to be a bipartisan organisation with both right and left-wing members.

Notes and references

External links
Chris Trotter's blog

1956 births
Living people
New Zealand columnists
New Zealand left-wing activists
New Zealand Labour Party politicians
NewLabour Party (New Zealand) politicians
Unsuccessful candidates in the 1990 New Zealand general election
University of Otago alumni